Jacky Baniomo (born 16 April 1983) is a Cameroonian handball player for Usarsport and the Cameroonian national team.

She participated at the 2017 World Women's Handball Championship.

References

1983 births
Living people
Cameroonian female handball players
Competitors at the 2019 African Games
African Games competitors for Cameroon
African Games medalists in handball
20th-century Cameroonian women
21st-century Cameroonian women
African Games silver medalists for Cameroon